Gerardo García León (born 7 December 1974), known simply as Gerardo, is a Spanish retired footballer, currently manager of EDF Logroño women's team. A defender of wide range, he operated on the right flank.

During his extensive professional career he played for ten different clubs, all in his country, after emerging through Real Madrid's youth system. He amassed La Liga totals of 240 games and nine goals mainly in representation of Málaga (five seasons), adding 280 matches and 19 goals in the Segunda División.

Club career
Born in Seville, Andalusia, Gerardo was an unsuccessful Real Madrid graduate – he never appeared for the first team – and started playing professionally in the Segunda División, with CD Leganés, UE Lleida and CD Badajoz. In 1998–99 he made his debut in La Liga, playing 34 matches for Villarreal CF who was relegated at the season's end.

Having started 1999–2000 in the second division, Gerardo was purchased by Valencia CF in January 2000, appearing scarcely for the Che during the campaign but being a starter in the UEFA Champions League final loss to Real Madrid. He spent 2000–01 on loan to CA Osasuna, also in the top flight.

Gerardo had his most successfully period at Málaga CF, playing five seasons for a side that had four consecutive mid-table positions and also helping them win the 2002 UEFA Intertoto Cup. In 2005–06 the team finished last, with the player scoring twice (in two 2–1 defeats).

For 2006–07, Gerardo joined Real Sociedad, who would also be relegated at the end of the campaign. He retained his first-choice status in his second and third years.

Gerardo moved to Córdoba CF initially for one season, in the last hours of the August 2009 transfer window. After only 12 second-tier games in the second season, the 36-year-old left after his contract was not re-renewed, and signed for SD Logroñés of Tercera División, retiring two years later.

After retiring, Gerardo founded the 'Gerardo García León Tiki-taka Football Academy' and also acted as youth coach for amateurs Comillas CF. On 12 June 2019, he was appointed manager of Primera División (women) team EDF Logroño.

Personal life
Gerardo's two older brothers, Eduardo (born 1969) and Moisés, and younger Manuel (1978), were also footballers. The second, a forward, played nearly 600 games as a professional.

Honours
Valencia
UEFA Champions League runner-up: 1999–2000

Málaga
UEFA Intertoto Cup: 2002

Spain U16
UEFA European Under-16 Championship: 1991

Spain U17
FIFA U-17 World Cup runner-up: 1991

References

External links

1974 births
Living people
Spanish footballers
Footballers from Seville
Association football defenders
La Liga players
Segunda División players
Segunda División B players
Tercera División players
Real Madrid Castilla footballers
Real Madrid C footballers
CD Leganés players
UE Lleida players
CD Badajoz players
Villarreal CF players
Valencia CF players
CA Osasuna players
Málaga CF players
Real Sociedad footballers
Córdoba CF players
SD Logroñés players
Spain youth international footballers
Spain under-23 international footballers
Spanish football managers
Primera División (women) managers